Jeff Fenwick (born 8 February 1958) is a former Zimbabwean cricket umpire. He stood in six ODI games between 2000 and 2001.

See also
 List of One Day International cricket umpires

References

1958 births
Living people
Zimbabwean One Day International cricket umpires
People from Ormskirk